The following organizations are national anti-doping organizations (NADOs) affiliated with the World Anti-Doping Agency (WADA). Each are charged with testing their nation's athletes as well as running anti-doping programmes for all athletes competing at events held within their country's borders. In most nations dedicated agencies exist, though in some the official NADO is an organization with a wider remit such as a National Olympic Committee or government department.

The WADA maintains a list of NADOs on their website.

References

Anti-d